A Heart in Pawn is a 1919 American silent drama film directed by William Worthington. Sessue Hayakawa's Haworth Pictures Corporation produced the film and Worthington played the lead role along with Vola Vale and his wife Tsuru Aoki.

Cast
Sessue Hayakawa as Tomaya
Vola Vale as Emily Stone
Tsuru Aoki as Sada
Florence Vidor as Dr. Stone's daughter

References

External links 

 

American silent feature films
Silent American drama films
1919 drama films
Films directed by William Worthington
American black-and-white films
Haworth Pictures Corporation films
1919 films
Film Booking Offices of America films
1910s American films